R/V Oceanus is a Regional Class research vessel owned by the National Science Foundation, based in Newport, Oregon, and maintained and operated by Oregon State University. The ship was originally delivered to the Woods Hole Oceanographic Institution (WHOI) for operation as a part of the U.S. Academic Research Fleet as a University-National Oceanographic Laboratory System (UNOLS) designated operator. in November, 1975. Oceanus made the first operational cruise in April, 1976 and operated under WHOI for thirty-six years in the Atlantic with some operations in the Mediterranean and Caribbean.  The ship was scheduled to be retired in November 2011 but instead was transferred to Oregon State University, College of Earth, Ocean, and Atmospheric Sciences, for operation, replacing sister ship, R/V Wecoma.

On January 25, 2012 the ship began transit to Newport, Oregon and the Hatfield Marine Science Center for operation by Oregon State University. Oceanus arrived in Newport, Oregon on February 21, 2012 ahead of the March retirement of sister ship R/V Wecoma.  Oceanus was an interim replacement during the period while NSF began the design and construction of three new Regional Class Research Vessels, the first of which is expected to be launched in 2023 and to be operated by OSU under the name RCRV Taani for NSF.

Oceanus was built by Peterson Builders of Sturgeon Bay, Wisconsin to a design by John W. Gilbert Associates, Boston, completed 1975 with a mid-life refit in 1994. She carries a crew of 12 with capacity for up to 19 project personnel with 1,185 square feet of laboratory space.

R/V Oceanus was described by WHOI as "the North Atlantic workhorse of the WHOI-UNOLS fleet", used extensively in Gulf Stream and ocean circulation systems.

References 

 R/V Oceanus Specifications, Woods Hole Oceanographic Institution (General reference for ship specifications)

External links 
 R/V Oceanus, College of Earth, Ocean, and Atmospheric Sciences, Oregon State University

Research vessels of the National Science Foundation
University-National Oceanographic Laboratory System research vessels
1976 ships
Ships built by Peterson Builders
Oregon State University
Woods Hole Oceanographic Institution